The Iowa Department of Transportation Motor Vehicle Enforcement is a law enforcement agency located in the state of Iowa.  Like the Iowa State Patrol, Motor Vehicle Enforcement (MVE as they are most commonly called) is a statewide agency. Their primary mission and expertise is the enforcement of laws and regulations concerning commercial motor vehicles in the state.

The officers deal with state and Federal safety regulations, hazardous material regulations, commercial drivers licensing, commercial vehicle registration, oversize vehicles, fuel tax compliance, ensuring drivers are medically certified, and ensuring driver follow log book regulations.  The officers are certified law enforcement officers, and can assist with other law enforcement duties as required.

There are 94 sworn peace officers in the agency.  Officers with Motor Vehicle Enforcement drive Chevy Tahoe PPV that are white in color.

History
In early 1941 highway engineers expressed concern that overweight commercial vehicles would eventually cause serious damage to Iowa's highway system.  Legislation was passed, and signed into law on April 16, 1941 that allowed the highway commission to designate certain employees as peace officers to enforce the laws concerning size and weight.  The first officer entered service on July 1 of that year.

In 1975 the Iowa Department of Transportation was formed.  As part of the law forming the Iowa DOT, the highway commission officers, officers of the Iowa Commerce Commission, and motor vehicle investigators from the Iowa Department of Public Safety were combined into the modern Iowa DOT Motor Vehicle Enforcement.  This new department was placed under the authority of the Iowa DOT.

See also
List of law enforcement agencies in Iowa

References 

State law enforcement agencies of Iowa